Cyanoacetylene is an organic compound with formula  or .  It is the simplest cyanopolyyne.  Cyanoacetylene has been detected by spectroscopic methods in interstellar clouds, in the coma of comet Hale–Bopp and in the atmosphere of Saturn's moon Titan, where it sometimes forms expansive fog-like clouds.

Cyanoacetylene is one of the molecules that was produced in the Miller–Urey experiment.

 H-C#C-H + H-C#N -> H-C#C-C#N + H2

See also
Dicyanoacetylene, N≡C−C≡C−C≡N
Diacetylene, H−C≡C−C≡C−H
Cyanogen, N≡C−C≡N
Hydrocyanic acid, H−C≡N
Polyyne, R−(C≡C)n−R

References

Alkyne derivatives
Conjugated nitriles